The discography of Big Country, a Scottish rock band which formed in 1981, consists of nine studio albums, eighteen live albums, twenty-five compilation albums, one extended play (EP), and twenty-nine singles released on Mercury Records, Reprise Records, Vertigo Records and Cherry Red Records.

Formed by Stuart Adamson following the demise of Skids, the band's classic line-up of Adamson (vocals/guitar), Bruce Watson (guitar), Tony Butler (bass) and Mark Brzezicki (drums) met with critical and commercial success during the 1980s. After signing to Mercury Records, Big Country's debut album The Crossing, released in 1983, reached number three in the UK Album Chart and their subsequent albums Steeltown (1984), The Seer (1986) and Peace in Our Time (1988) all reached the top ten. By the time of the band's fifth album, No Place Like Home (1991), their commercial success had begun to wane and they released three more albums between 1993 and 1999 before the suicide of Adamson in 2001 led to the band splitting up.

In 2007, Butler, Watson and Brzezicki celebrated the twenty-fifth anniversary of Big Country by reforming for a UK tour, touring again in 2010, this time with Mike Peters joining the band for vocal duties. 2011 saw the release of a new single, the band's first new music for eleven years, before Butler retired in 2012. In 2013 the line-up of Watson, Brzezicki, Peters, joined by Derek Forbes (bass) and Watson's son Jamie (guitar), released a new album, The Journey.

Albums

Studio albums

Live albums
Without the Aid of a Safety Net (May 1994) UK No. 35
Radio 1 Sessions (September 1994)
BBC Live in Concert (August 1995)
Eclectic (August 1996) UK No. 41
Greatest Hits Live (Mar 1997) (same as "Without the Aid of a Safety Net")
King Biscuit Flower Hour (March 1997)
Brighton Rock (September 1997)
Live at Wolverhampton (January 2000)
Come Up Screaming (October 2000)
Keep on Truckin (January 2001)
Peace Concert, Live In East Berlin 1988 (January 2001)
One in a Million (June 2001)
Live Hits (Aug 2003) (from various concerts in 1984, 1986, 1988 and 1991)
Das Fest - Live in Germany 95 (January 2002)
Wonderland Live (German Armoury label) (January 2002) (this is just Brighton Rock but with different packaging and different track order)
Live in Cologne (Apr 2002)
Without the Aid of a Safety Net - The Complete Concert (2 CDs) (May 2005)
Twenty Five Live (Nov 2007)
Live 2011 Shepherds Bush Empire 15.04.2011 (2011)
Dreams Stay With You, Edinburgh Picture House (2011)

Compilation albums
Through a Big Country: Greatest Hits (June 1990) UK No. 2
The Collection (February 1993)
The Best of Big Country (February 1994)
In a Big Country (June 1995)
Master Series (March 1997)
Kings of Emotion (April 1998)
Restless Natives & Rarities (June 1998)
Rarities II (April 2001)
20th Century Masters - The Millennium Collection: The Best of Big Country (April 2001)
Greatest 12 Inch Hits (September 2001)
Universal Masters Collection - Classic Big Country (November 2001)
www.bigcountry.co.uk (November 2001)
Greatest hits of Big Country & The Skids (May 2002) UK No. 71
Singles Collection Vol. 1: The Mercury Years ('83 - '84) (6-CD box set) (July 2002)
Singles Collection Vol. 2: The Mercury Years ('84 - '88) (7-CD box set) (October 2002)
Rarities III (December 2002)
Singles Collection Vol. 3: ('88 - '93) (7-CD box set) (February 2003)
Singles Collection Vol. 4: ('91 - '00) (7-CD box set) (June 2003)
The Collection (Spectrum Music) (October 2003)
Rarities IV: (The Crossing Sessions) (November 2003)
Rarities V: (No Place Like Home Sessions) (March 2004)
Rarities VI (April 2004)
Rarities VII: (The Damascus Sessions) (November 2004)
Rarities VIII (November 2005)
Fields of Fire - The Ultimate Collection (April 2011) UK No. 77
Big Country at the BBC (July 2013)
Big Country at the BBC - The Best of the BBC Recordings (July 2013)
And...In the Beginning (Dec 2012)
Why The Long Face, 4CD Deluxe Expanded Box Set (June 2018)
And in the Beginning
Essential (July 2020)  UK No. 23

Other albums
In the Scud (EP) (January 1999)
Bon Apetit (EP) (September 1999)
Big Country: The Nashville Album (April 2000)
Undercover (covers album) (March 2001)

Extended plays

Singles

References

Discographies of British artists
 
 
Rock music group discographies
New wave discographies